Magnolia praecalva is a species of plant in the family Magnoliaceae. It is a tree found in Peninsular Malaysia, Sumatra, Thailand and Vietnam. In Vietnam, the species is found in the evergreen broadleaved forests of the High Plateau. It has suffered from population decline due to its exploitation for timber.

References

praecalva
Least concern plants
Trees of Sumatra
Trees of Peninsular Malaysia
Trees of Thailand
Trees of Vietnam
Taxonomy articles created by Polbot